Y. Michal Bodemann is professor emeritus, University of Toronto, sociologist, best known for his work on German Jewry, the concept of ideological labor and "memory theater" (1991) and his contributions to sociological praxis, interventive field work, here in particular, his interventive observation method  in qualitative field work. In the approach to interventive observation, Bodemann advocates the reciprocal nature of researcher and the people in a setting, as active participation, against the notion of passive or neutral role of the observer. Bodemann's theoretical foundation continues to be influential against positivist notions of objectivity, which still persist in the field of sociology and in the approach to qualitative methods. His methodological approach is close to that of Michael Burawoy and notions of public sociology. Bodemann is best known for his contributions to Jewish studies, and Holocaust memory his concept of "ideological labour:" where especially ethnic minorities are cast as representing values contrasting those of the larger society. He is the author and editor of books, newspaper and academic articles spanning the entirety of his academic career, in English, German and Italian.

Early life and education: 1944–1966
Y. Michal Bodemann was born on March 9, 1944. His early childhood was spent in the Bavarian Alps where his father, an artist, had withdrawn as part of a community of writers and artists. Bodemann completed gymnasium in Korntal near Stuttgart. He began his studies at the universities of Munich, Heidelberg and Mannheim. In 1966, he moved to Cambridge, Massachusetts where he continued his studies in sociology and literature at Brandeis University. Bodemann completed his PhD. at Brandeis University in 1979.

PhD thesis: Telemula (1800–1980)
Bodemann's PhD Thesis entitled Telemula: Aspects of the micro-organization of backwardness in central Sardinia included qualitative fieldwork and methods, ethnographic participant observation, and qualitative interview based research. The thesis explored the development of backwardness in a small village in Sardinia from 1800 until 1980. It examined how the community became geographically marginalized and how the communal subsistence economy was disrupted and destroyed on account of new forms of taxation and privatization of land as well as the ecological destruction of its natural environment, especially deforestation. Furthermore, the dissertation focused on the rise and fall of family compacts in the community and the transformation of its kinship structures over the one hundred years.

Academic career

University of Toronto: 1974–2012
In 1974, Bodemann accepted a teaching position at the University of Toronto where he taught until 2012. In 1977 Bodemann became assistant professor at the University of Toronto, quickly becoming appointed to the graduate faculty in 1979 and soon after, associate professor with tenure in 1980. He was appointed to Full Professor in 1993. His teaching included classical sociological theory, qualitative sociological methods, focusing on critically examining the praxis of sociological inquiry.

Teaching
At the graduate level, he has taught 'Historical and Ethnographic Methods', 'Qualitative Methods', and, among others, 'Political Sociology of Germany in Contemporary Europe'. At the undergraduate level, he has taught numerous seminars in both North America and Europe, including, 'Field Methods', 'The Jewish Community in Europe and North America', 'Ethnicity in Social Organization', 'Comparative Ethnic Relations', and among others 'Sociological Theory'. Some courses in German, and in Europe, have included, 'Zu politischen Soziologie Gramscis', 'Marxismus und Juden "frage"', and '"Rasse" und Ethnizität in westlichen Gesellschaften', which covered issues of race, ethnicity, issues/topics related to the German Jewry, and political/sociological theories.

Academic appointments
Throughout his now well-established career, Bodemann positioned himself in both the North American and European sociological scene. Along with his academic appointments at the University of Toronto he held visiting appointments at the University of Haifa and Hebrew University, Tel Aviv, the Free University (Freie Universität), and Humboldt (Humboldt-Universität), Berlin. From 2008 was the director of the European Office of the University of Toronto in Berlin and was affiliated with the Joint Initiative in German and European Studies (JIGES) and the Ethnic and Pluralism Studies Program at the University of Toronto where he was appointed to the Munk School of Global Affairs.

Professional affiliations
Bodemann was associate editor of the "Canadian Journal of Sociology" (1985–1987), the associate editor of the "Canadian Jewish Outlook" (1979–1982) and the editor of "Sardinia Newsletter" (1980–1983). Among the other professional affiliations and activities, from 1980 onwards, Bodemann belonged to the "Insurgent Sociologist" /"Critical Sociology Toronto Collective". Through the decades his active membership and critical, often anti-positivist and methodologically radical insights influenced many of his young contemporaries.

Thought

German Jewry
In the early 1980s, Bodemann began his research on the rise of the Jewish Community in Germany after World War II. His work, on the German Jewry is dominated by the question: How was it possible that after the Holocaust, and the total destruction of the German-Jewish community, a new Jewish community could develop in Germany?Bodemann has argued that this was only possible because Western Germany at the time actively supported the new establishment of a Jewish community in order to signal to its Western neighbors, during the Cold War its break with the Nazi past. This real-political maneuver notwithstanding, the new generations felt genuine regret and attempted to recuperate the German Jewish intellectual and cultural heritage. Bodemann also claims, that linking up to the past could only be accomplished by means of the construction of memory. In this regard, Bodemann has written extensively on the construction of memory of Kristallnacht and its permutations over the decades after the Shoah. In particular, he has argued that the date of 9 November 1938 is incorrect: the pogroms were more profuse and started in full force on 10 November, mostly not at night but during the light of day.

His book, Gedächtnistheater. Die jüdische Gemeinschaft und ihre deutsche Erfindung (Theatre of Memory. The Jewish Community and its German Invention, 1996) was listed as one of the top ten non-fiction books by the German book critics that year. His book, A Jewish Family in Germany Today, a monograph on an extended Jewish family living in Germany today appeared 2005 with Duke University Press.

Ideological labor
The concept of ideological labor has its seeds in Everett Hughes idea of a moral division of labor, which is a "process by which differing moral functions are distributed among members of society, as individuals and categories of individuals" (Hughes, 1971: 289). For Bodemann ideological labor outlines the ways in which ethnic groups perform a specific ideological function within society. In his research, he outlines, how the German Jewry functioned in postwar West Germany to re-capture Jewish identity and culture in Germany following the Holocaust.

Bodemann accounts for three phases in the relationship between the German Jewry, ethnicity and the state post World War II, which show how ideological labor functioned and continues to function into the present:

 1. Mediation: The first phase (post WWII – 1952) Bodemann calls "the phase of charismatic mediators" (Bodemann, 1990: 39). In this first phase, diverse groups from diverse backgrounds come together in She'erit Hapletah ("saved remnant").

 2. Reconsolidation: The second phase is when the process of bureaucratic reconsolidation occurs, and there is an active reconstruction of Jewish life.

 3. Representationism: The third phase is the phase that continues in the present, with the continued representation of Jewish life, culture and religion in public life, or what Bodemann calls representationism''.

Works and publications
Bodemann is the author of numerous articles and editor of many books, for example:

Selected books
Bodemann, Y. M. (1996), Gedächtnistheater. Die jüdische Gemeinschaft und ihre deutsche Erfindung (Theatre of Memory. The Jewish Community and its German Invention). Hamburg, Rotbuch Verlag.
Bodemann, Y. M. (1996), Jews, Germans, Memory: Reconstructions of Jewish Life in Germany. Ann Arbor, University of Michigan Press.
Bodemann, Y. M. (2002), In den Wogen der Erinnerung. Jüdisches Leben in Deutschland. (In the tides of memory, Jewish life in Germany). München, DTV.
Bodemann, Y. M. (2005), A Jewish Family in Germany Today: An Intimate Portrait. Durham, NC, Duke University Press.
 Bodemann, Y. M., ed., (2007), Citizenship and Immigrant Incorporation. Comparative Perspectives on North America and Western Europe. London – New York, Palgrave Macmillan, with Gökçe Yurdakul, eds., with an introduction by Michal Bodemann.
 Bodemann, Y. M., ed., (2008),  The New German Jewry and the European Context. Palgrave Macmillan.

Selected articles
 Bodemann, Y. M. (1978)  "A Problem of Sociological Praxis. The Case for Interventive Observation in Field Work." Theory and Society, Volume 5, Issue 4 (June), Pages 387 – 420.
 Bodemann, Y. M. (1979)  "The Fulfillment of Field Work in Marxist Praxis." Dialectical Anthropology, Volume 4, Issue March–April, Pages 155 – 161.
 Bodemann, Y. M. (1991)  "The State in the Construction of Ethnicity, and Ideological Labour: The Case of German Jewry." Critical Sociology, Volume 17, Issue 3, Pages 35 – 46.
 Bodemann, Y. M. (1993)  "Priests, Prophets, Jews and Germans: The Political Basis of Max Weber's Conception of Ethno-national Solidarities."] Archives Européennes de Sociologie, Volume 34, Pages 224 – 247.
 Bodemann, Y. M. (1999)  "Eclipse of Memory. German Representations of Auschwitz in the post-War Period.", New German Critique, Volume 75, Pages 57 – 89.
 Bodemann, Y. M. (2005) "Geborgte Narrative: Wie sich Türkische Einwanderer an den Juden in Deutschland orientieren." "Borrowed narratives. How the Turkish immigrants orient themselves on the Jews in Germany.") Soziale Welt, Pages 441 – 451, (with Gökçe Yurdakul).

References

External links
 Staff page at the University of Toronto, Department of Sociology
 Ethnic and Pluralism Studies – University of Toronto
 Bucerius Institute – University of Haifa

1944 births
Brandeis University alumni
Canadian people of German descent
Living people
Academic staff of the University of Toronto